Kurtziella hebe is a species of small, predatory sea snail, a marine gastropod mollusk in the family Mangeliidae.

Description
The length of the shell attains 10 mm, its diameter 3.5 mm.

(Original description) The small, slender, acute shell is yellowish white. Its protoconch contains two smooth whorls, followed by five or six subsequent whorls. The spiral sculpture consists of fine equal uniform threads covering the whole whorl separated by narrow grooves and given a frosty appearance by fine sharp incremental lines. The axial sculpture consists of (on the body whorl eight or nine) narrow rounded ribs extended over the whole whorl with wider interspaces and somewhat constricted in front of the appressed suture. There is no evident anal fascicle apart from the constrictio. The aperture is narrow. The anal sulcus is hardly evident. The outer lip is sharp, moderately varicose, smooth inside, with the spiral sculpture showing through the thin
shell. The inner lip is erased. The columella is straight. The siphonal canal is produced but is hardly differentiated.

Distribution
This marine species occurs off San Diego, California, USA

References

External links
  Tucker, J.K. 2004 Catalog of recent and fossil turrids (Mollusca: Gastropoda). Zootaxa 682:1–1295.

hebe
Gastropods described in 1919